

Arnold Hans Albert Burmeister (28 February 1899  – 2 July 1988) was a German general during World War II who commanded the 25th Panzergrenadier Division.  He was a recipient of the Knight's Cross of the Iron Cross of Nazi Germany.

Awards and decorations

 Knight's Cross of the Iron Cross on  14 April 1945 as Generalmajor and commander of 25. Panzergrenadier-Division

References

Citations

Bibliography

 

1899 births
1988 deaths
People from Sønderborg Municipality
Recipients of the clasp to the Iron Cross, 2nd class
Recipients of the Gold German Cross
Recipients of the Knight's Cross of the Iron Cross
German prisoners of war in World War I
World War I prisoners of war held by France
German prisoners of war in World War II held by the United Kingdom
People from the Province of Schleswig-Holstein
Military personnel from Schleswig-Holstein